KwaZulu-Natal coastal lowland forest is a subtropical forest type that was once found almost continuously along the low-lying coastal areas of KwaZulu-Natal, South Africa. It still exists in protected areas, but much has been cleared for sugar-cane plantations and housing developments.

List of trees (incomplete)
 Albizia adianthifolia - Flat-crown
 Bridelia micrantha - Coastal Goldenleaf
 Celtis africana - White Stinkwood
 Chaetachme aristata - Thorny Elm
 Chrysophyllum viridifolium - Fluted Milkwood
 Croton sylvaticus - Forest Fever-berry
 Deinbollia oblongifolia - Dune Soap-berry
 Ekebergia capensis - Cape Ash
 Englerophytum natalense - Natal Milkplum
 Ficus natalensis - Natal Fig
 Margaritaria discoidea - Common Pheasant-berry
 Phoenix reclinata - Wild Date Palm
 Protorhus longifolia - Red Beech
 Strelitzia nicolai - Natal Wild Banana
 Trema orientalis - Pigeonwood
 Trichilia dregeana - Forest Mahogany
 Xylotheca kraussiana - African Dog-rose

Bibliography
 Carruthers, V. (2001). Sasol First Field Guide to Frogs. 
 Pooley, E. (1993). The Complete Field Guide to Trees of Natal, Zululand and Transkei. .
 Pooley, E. (1998). A Field Guide to Wild Flowers; KwaZulu-Natal and the Eastern Region. .
 Pooley, T. and Player, I. (1995). KwaZulu-Natal Wildlife Destinations. .
 van Oudtshoorn, F. (1992). Guide to Grasses of South Africa. .

See also
 Forests of KwaZulu-Natal

 

Geography of KwaZulu-Natal
Forests of South Africa